WSBV is a Black Gospel formatted broadcast radio station licensed to South Boston, Virginia, serving South Boston and Halifax County, Virginia.  WSBV is owned by Lamont Logan, through licensee Logan Broadcasting, Inc.

References

External links

Radio stations established in 1989
Gospel radio stations in the United States
1989 establishments in Virginia
SBV
SBV